KSDI-LD, VHF digital channel 12, is a low-powered Telemax-affiliated television station licensed to Fresno, California, United States. The station is owned by Cocola Broadcasting.

History
The station was noted for its commitment to local programming. Originally broadcasting on channel 34, the then-KSDI-LP invited individuals and organizations to produce their own television programs. Similar to many public-access cable television networks, many locals became a part of the programming on KSDI-LP.

The main channel has cycled through many affiliations. In 2006, it suffered the loss of two networks in a row: when Urban America Television folded in May of that year, it switched to Shop At Home, which itself closed on June 21.

The station's license was transferred to RF Channel 12 by the Federal Communications Commission on February 12, 2020.

Subchannels
The station's digital signal is multiplexed:

See also 
 KGOF-LD

References

External links
Cocola Broadcasting official site
Central Valley Talk
Fresno Forward

SDI-LD
Television channels and stations established in 1987
1987 establishments in California
Low-power television stations in the United States